Chilo niponella is a moth in the family Crambidae. It was described by Thunberg in 1788. It is found in Japan and the Russian Far East.

References

Chiloini
Moths described in 1788